The Miracle of Lanciano is a Eucharistic miracle alleged to have occurred in the eighth century in the city of Lanciano, Italy. According to tradition, a monk who had doubts about the real presence of Christ in the Eucharist found, when he said the words of consecration at Mass, that the bread and wine changed into flesh and blood. The Catholic Church officially recognizes the miracle as authentic.

The story is similar to the tradition known as the Mass of Saint Gregory, first recorded in the 8th century by Paul the Deacon.

Traditional account

The first known reports of the event date to 1574 and do not specify the exact year in which it would have occurred, but some believe that certain historical circumstances allow it to be placed chronologically eight centuries earlier, between 730 and 750.  The Byzantine emperor Leo III the Isaurian, who reigned from 717 to 741, implemented a strict policy against religious images by promulgating an edict in 730 ordering their destruction. Mosaics and frescoes were destroyed with hammers, icons are thrown into the fire and several Greek monks were killed. As a consequence, many religious people, including numerous Basilian monks, took refuge in Italy.

The miracle is usually described roughly as follows: In the city of Lanciano, Italy, then known as Anxanum, some time in the 700s, a Basilian hieromonk was assigned to celebrate Mass at the monastery of St. Longinus. Celebrating in the Roman Rite and using unleavened bread, the monk had doubts about the Catholic doctrine of the real presence. During the Mass, when he said the Words of Consecration ("This is my body. This is my blood"), the priest saw the bread change into living flesh and, the wine change into blood which coagulated into five globules, of different shapes and sizes. 

Since there are no contemporary sources, the details and not even the name of the protagonist of the events are known, however, some sources give the idea that he must have been a priest of the Byzantine rite and a Basilian monk.

Relics

The Basilian monks purportedly kept custody of the Eucharistic elements until their departure in 1175. They were succeeded by Benedictine monks in 1176. The items were placed in different locations within the Church of St. Francis at Lanciano. They were kept in the Valsecca Chapel from 1636 until 1902 when they were relocated to a new altar.

As of 2012, the relics of this miracle were kept in the Church of St. Francis in Lanciano. In 2004, Pope John Paul II recalled visiting the relics there while a cardinal. They are displayed in a silver and glass reliquary made in Naples in 1713.

The "host" matter consists of a rounded membrane, yellow-brown in colour, with a shading of greater intensity, and contains a large central hole; it is identified with the flesh. The "wine" matter comes in the form of five earthy brown lumps of different shapes and sizes, claimed to be the coagulated blood. Over the centuries the relics were examined several times. During the first reconnaissance, carried out in 1574 by Archbishop Gaspare Rodriguez, it was said that the weight of each blood clot was equal to the total weight of the five clots. This alleged finding was interpreted theologically: Each drop of the consecrated wine contained in its entirety the complete and indivisible substance of the blood of Jesus. This finding could not be replicated in later investigations.

In November 1970, at the request of the Archbishop of Lanciano, Pacifico Maria Luigi Perantoni, and the Provincial Superior of the Order of Friars Minor Conventual of the Abruzzo region, Bruno Luciani, the Franciscan friars of Lanciano, who guarded the relics, decided, with the authorization of the Vatican, to have them subjected to medical-scientific analysis. The task was entrusted to Odoardo Linoli, head of the laboratory of clinical analysis and pathological anatomy of the hospital of Arezzo - full professor of anatomy, histology, chemistry, and clinical microscopy - and to Ruggero Bertelli, professor of anatomy at the University of Siena. The examination revealed that the relics were human heart muscle tissue

Silvano Fuso, a member of the Italian Committee for the Investigation of Claims of the Pseudosciences, pointed out the strangeness of the fact that there were no sources older than 1574 for an event of the eighth century.

References

External links
 
 Santuario del Miracolo Eucharistico

8th-century Christianity
8th century in Italy
Eucharist
Christian miracles
Medieval Abruzzo
Lanciano